The 1973 Afghan coup d'état, also called by Afghans as the Coup of 26 Saratan and self-proclaimed as the Revolution of 26 Saratan 1352, was led by Army General and prince Mohammed Daoud Khan against his cousin, King Mohammed Zahir Shah, on 17 July 1973, which resulted in the establishment of the Republic of Afghanistan under a one-party system led by Daoud Khan. 

For the coup, Daoud Khan led forces in Kabul along with then-chief of staff General Abdul Karim Mustaghni, to overthrow the monarchy while the King was convalescing abroad in Ischia, Italy. Daoud Khan was assisted by Army officers and civil servants from the Parcham faction of the PDPA, including Air Force colonel Abdul Qadir. Seven police officers and one tank commander died in what was described at the time by staff from the United States National Security Council as a "well planned and swiftly executed coup".

King Zahir Shah decided not to retaliate and he formally abdicated on August 24, remaining in Italy in exile. More than two centuries of royal rule (since the founding of the Durrani Empire in 1747) ended with the coup.

Background
Zahir Shah had ruled as King since 1933, and his cousin Prince Daoud Khan had served as Prime Minister from 1953 to 1963. Daoud Khan had strained relations with the King and he was also unable to hold political office after the 1964 constitution, which barred members of the Barakzai dynasty. Some believe the King did this on purpose because of Daoud Khan's strong pro-Pashtunistan views, which he deemed too radical and led to political rifts with Pakistan.

Daoud Khan took the opportunity during growing discontent from the public over the failure of reforms by five successive governments since a parliamentary monarchy was formed in 1964, including the King's failure to promulgate the Political Parties Law, Provincial Councils Law, and Municipal Councils Act, all of which were passed by parliament. Another reason was the poor response to the famine in 1971–72 that is believed to have killed thousands in the central and north-western parts of the country, particularly Ghor Province - causing the resignation of Prime Minister Abdul Zahir's government. Circa 1972 people were unhappy with the parliament's ineffectiveness and lack of leadership, leading to growing various political movements at universities. Daoud Khan's internal disputes with the King has also been cited as a possible reason of his decision to launch a coup.

Some scholars and historians have suggested a possible involvement of the Soviet Union in the coup, although the evidence is weak.

The coup
King Zahir Shah left Afghanistan for London, via Rome, on the morning of June 25, 1973 for hemorrhaging treatment after injuring his eye. After treatment he went back to Italy spending time in the island of Ischia. Mohammed Daoud Khan with several hundreds of his supporters from the army launched the coup on the morning of July 17; within hours and without any armed resistance, the monarchy ended and Khan announced the new republic through Radio Afghanistan at 7 in the morning. Staff from the United States National Security Council described it as a "well planned and swiftly executed coup."

The only casualties were 7 police officers at a station, who engaged the rebels, who they recognised as a hostile force; and a tank commander who drowned in the Kabul River after swerving off the road trying to avoid colliding with a bus.

Aftermath
Despite being part of the Musahiban Barakzai dynasty, Daoud Khan abolished the monarchy and created a new Republic instead, declaring himself as head of state and head of government, foreign minister and head of the Army. The royal Arg (palace) in Kabul became the official presidential residence. In a radio address, he called the coup a "national and progressive revolution", calling the King's rule “corrupt and effete” and vowed to replace it with “genuine democracy”. He pledged to continue Afghanistan's long-standing policy of neutrality. The Soviet Union and India diplomatically recognized the new government on July 19.

Daoud Khan's links to Marxism, and the Parchamite support in his military coup, led to some suspecting it as being a communist takeover. In order to prevent opposition, he assured continuity of religious and cultural heritage, as demonstrated in the Republican Decrees created in July 1973.  Upon coming to power, Daoud Khan disbanded the parliament and the judiciary, with direct executive rule established. Despite his socialist views, Khan did not bring drastic change to the economic system and maintained connections with the Cold War superpowers.

A loya jirga was convened following the Constitutional Assembly election in January 1977, and approved a new constitution creating a presidential one-party state, with strong powers to the head of state. Daoud started re-approaching the United States and Pakistan, which contributed to the deterioration of his relations with the Soviet Union and the PDPA communists. Eventually he was overthrown and killed during the Saur Revolution in 1978, including by several high-ranking civilian and military officials who helped him to obtain power in 1973.

Notes

References

See also 
Saur Revolution

20th-century revolutions
1970s coups d'état and coup attempts
1973 in Afghanistan
Military coups in Afghanistan
1973 in military history
Conflicts in 1973
July 1973 events in Asia